Răzvan Ştefănel Farmache (born 1 November 1978) is a Romanian footballer. He is a player-manager for Liga IV side FC Urziceni. In his career Farmache played for other three clubs: Rocar București, Sportul Studențesc and Farul Constanța.

External links
 
 
 

1978 births
Living people
People from Urziceni
Romanian footballers
Association football defenders
Liga I players
Liga II players
AFC Rocar București players
FCV Farul Constanța players
FC Sportul Studențesc București players
Romanian football managers